John-Olav Einemo (born 10 December 1975) is a Norwegian retired mixed martial artist. He is also a Brazilian Jiu-Jitsu practitioner, with the highlight of his career being the win in the ADCC Submission Wrestling World Championship in 2003 (88–98 kg weight class). He is the only man to defeat multiple-time BJJ champion Roger Gracie in the ADCC Submission Wrestling World Championship tournament. He holds a black belt in Brazilian Jiu-Jitsu.

Mixed martial arts career

Early career
Einemo made his professional MMA debut in the year 2000.  He fought for a number of promotions in Finland and the Netherlands, quickly amassing an undefeated record of 4–0.  He made his Japanese debut in 2003 for the Shooto promotion in 2003.

Einemo did not compete from 2003–2006 due to complications of contracting a flesh-eating bacterial infection on his left foot following surgery.   He completely recovered and returned to fighting in early 2006.  He experienced his first professional loss in PRIDE Fighting Championships where he lost to Fabrício Werdum by unanimous decision at Pride 31.

Ultimate Fighting Championship
On March 7, 2011, Einemo signed with the UFC to join their Heavyweight Division.

Einemo was scheduled to make his UFC debut against Shane Carwin on June 11, 2011 at UFC 131.  However, once Brock Lesnar pulled out of his fight against Junior dos Santos after again suffering with diverticulitis, Carwin stepped in to take Lesnar's place in the main event.  Einemo instead fought fellow UFC newcomer Dave Herman. Einemo lost via TKO (punches) at 3:19 of round 2.  This fight earned him Fight of the Night honors.

On August 3, 2011, Golden Glory announced that Einemo had been released from his contract by the UFC. The UFC later reversed the decision, reinstating Einemo.

In his second UFC fight, Einemo faced Mike Russow on January 28, 2012 at UFC on Fox: Evans vs. Davis. He lost the fight via unanimous decision. He was subsequently released from the promotion.

Retirement
Einemo announced his retirement from mixed martial arts on April 3, 2012. He said he would continue to stay involved in the sport as a coach and help the sport grow in his native Norway.

Championships and accomplishments

ADCC career
2007 Superfight – Lost against Roger Gracie
2005 88–98 kg weight class – Quarter Finals – Won against Vitor Vianna
2003 88–98 kg weight class – Final – Won against Alexandre Ferreira
2003 88–98 kg weight class – Won against Roger Gracie
2001 88–98 kg weight class – Quarter Finals – Won against Rolles Gracie
2001 Under 99 kg weight class - Semi-Finals - Lost against Ricardo Arona

MMA career
Ultimate Fighting Championship
Fight of the Night (One time) vs. Dave Herman

Mixed martial arts record

|-
| Loss
| align=center| 6–3
| Mike Russow
| Decision (unanimous)
| UFC on Fox: Evans vs. Davis
| 
| align=center| 3
| align=center| 5:00
| Chicago, Illinois, United States
| 
|-
| Loss
| align=center| 6–2
| Dave Herman
| TKO (knee and punches)
| UFC 131
| 
| align=center| 2
| align=center| 3:19
| Vancouver, British Columbia, Canada
| 
|-
| Win
| align=center| 6–1
| James Thompson
| Submission (armbar)
| 2H2H: Pride & Honor
| 
| align=center| 1
| align=center| 4:18
| Rotterdam, Netherlands
| 
|-
| Loss
| align=center| 5–1
| Fabrício Werdum
| Decision (unanimous)
| PRIDE 31
| 
| align=center| 3
| align=center| 5:00
| Saitama, Japan
| 
|-
| Win
| align=center| 5–0
| Mindaugas Kulikauskas
| Submission (armbar)
| Shooto: Wanna Shooto 2003
| 
| align=center| 1
| align=center| 0:47
| Tokyo, Japan
| 
|-
| Win
| align=center| 4–0
| Evert Fyeet
| TKO (submission to punches)
| Shooto Finland
| 
| align=center| 1
| align=center| 1:54
| Turku, Finland
| 
|-
| Win
| align=center| 3–0
| Olaf in 't Veld
| TKO (submission to punches)
| Shooto Holland
| 
| align=center| 1
| align=center| 1:07
| Deventer, Netherlands
| 
|-
| Win
| align=center| 2–0
| Erkka Shalstrom
| TKO (punches)
| Finnfight 4
| 
| align=center| 1
| align=center| 2:22
| Turku, Finland
| 
|-
| Win
| align=center| 1–0
| Jan Jarvensivu
| Submission (armbar)
| Focus Fight Night 4
| 
| align=center| 1
| align=center| 4:20
| Hämeenlinna, Finland
|

Submission grappling record 
{| class="wikitable sortable" style="font-size:80%; text-align:left;"
|-
| colspan=8 style="text-align:center;" | 13 Matches, 8 Wins, 5 Losses
|-
!  Result
!  style="text-align:center;"| Rec.
!  Opponent
!  Method
!  Event
!  Division
!  Date
!  Location
|-
|Loss||style="text-align:center;"|8–5|| Roger Gracie  || Points || ADCC World Championship ||Superfight|| 2007 ||  Newark, NJ
|-
|Loss||style="text-align:center;"|8–4|| Alexandre Ribeiro  || Points ||  rowspan=4|ADCC World Championship || rowspan=4|-99 kg|| rowspan=4|2005  ||  rowspan=4| Los Angeles
|-
|Loss||style="text-align:center;"|8–3|| Alexandre Ferreira  || Points
|-
|Win||style="text-align:center;"|8–2|| Vitor Vianna  || Points 
|-
|Win||style="text-align:center;"|7–2|| Rick Macauley  || Submission 
|-
|Win||style="text-align:center;"|6–2|| Alexandre Ferreira  || Points  || rowspan=4|ADCC World Championship||rowspan=4|-99 kg || rowspan=4|2003 ||rowspan=4| São Paulo
|-
|Win||style="text-align:center;"|5–2|| Roger Gracie  || Points 
|-
|Win||style="text-align:center;"|4–2|| Larry Papadopoulos  || Points
|-
|Win||style="text-align:center;"|3–2|| Brandon Vera  || Points
|-
|Loss||style="text-align:center;"|2–2|| Alexandre Ferreira  || Points ||  rowspan=4|ADCC World Championship || rowspan=4|-99 kg|| rowspan=4|2001  ||  rowspan=4| Abu Dhabi
|-
|Loss||style="text-align:center;"|2–1|| Ricardo Arona  || Points
|-
|Win||style="text-align:center;"|2–0|| Rolles Gracie  || Points 
|-
|Win||style="text-align:center;"|1–0|| Rigan Machado  || Points 
|-

See also 
List of male mixed martial artists

References

Tournament Results – Official Homepages
 ADCC 2005 Results
 ADCC 2003 Results
 ADCC 2001 Results

External links

Official UFC Profile

1975 births
Living people
Norwegian male mixed martial artists
Heavyweight mixed martial artists
Mixed martial artists utilizing Brazilian jiu-jitsu
Norwegian practitioners of Brazilian jiu-jitsu
People awarded a black belt in Brazilian jiu-jitsu
Norwegian submission wrestlers
Sportspeople from Oslo
Norwegian people of Finnish descent
Ultimate Fighting Championship male fighters